Nocentelli: Live in San Francisco is a live album by guitarist Leo Nocentelli of The Meters. The album was recorded at Slim's nightclub in San Francisco. It was released by DJM Records in November 1997.

Background
Nocentelli performed regularly in a quartet with drummer Ziggy Modeliste. On this recording the quartet included keyboardist Kevin Walsh and bassist Nick Daniels. The performance was recorded by an audience member at Slim's nightclub in San Francisco. Unaware of the recording, Nocentelli received a Digital Audio Tape from the audience member. He asked a friend to convert it to analog tape. During conversion, a DJM Records executive heard the music and arranged for its release as an album.

Reception

Don Snowden of AllMusic noted that the album "could have been a great glimpse of two masters revisiting past highlights" and found it not fully satisfying. Tony Green of JazzTimes wrote, "the extended jams (...) give Nocentelli the space to step out of his rhythm guitar role for some smoldering classic fusion-leaning solos." John Koetzner of Blues Access had a positive review and said the album is a great way to discover The Meters and Nocentelli's talent.

Track listing

Personnel
Credits adapted from AllMusic.

Leo Nocentelli – guitar, vocals, liner notes, producer
Zigaboo Modeliste – drums, vocals
Nick Daniels – bass, vocals
Kevin Walsh – keyboards
Dan Morehouse – digital mastering, editing

References

1997 live albums
Leo Nocentelli albums
DJM Records live albums